Mariano Roque Alonso Romero (16 August 1792 Ybytimí – 7 August 1853) was President of the Provisional Junta of Paraguay from 9 February 1841 to 14 March 1841. On 14 March 1841, he established a government ruling jointly with Carlos Antonio López and they both styled themselves "consuls of the republic". After three years of this arrangement, on 13 March 1844, Roque Alonso resigned and López became the country's sole ruler.

References

1792 births
1853 deaths
People from Paraguarí Department
Paraguayan people of Spanish descent
Presidents of Paraguay
Paraguayan military personnel
19th-century Paraguayan people